The 1924 Women's Olympiad (formally called Women's International and British Games, French Grand meeting international féminin) was the first international competition for women in track and field in the United Kingdom. The tournament was held on 4 August 1924 in London, United Kingdom.

Events 
After the successful first 1922 Women's World Games in Paris and the three Women's Olympiads (1921 Women's Olympiad, 1922 Women's Olympiad and 1923 Women's Olympiad) in Monaco the interest for women's sports also grew internationally. In 1922 the "Women's Amateur Athletic Association" (WAAA) was founded in the UK: the WAAA organised the first official British women championships in track and field (WAAA Championships) on 18 August 1923 at the Oxo Sports Ground in Downham outside London. In the US the "Amateur Athletic Union" (AAU) organised the first official American women championships in track and field on 29 September 1923 at Weequahic Park in Newark, New Jersey.

The 1924 Women's Olympiad was organised in cooperation with the newspapers News of the World, Sporting Life and Daily Mirror in cooperation with the WAAA and the Fédération Sportive Féminine Internationale (FSFI) under chairwoman Alice Milliat.

The games were attended by participants from 8 nations: Belgium, Canada (exhibition events only), Czechoslovakia, France, Italy, Switzerland, the United Kingdom and the USA (exhibition events only). The tournament was a huge promotion for women's sports.

The athletes competed in 12 events: running (100 yards, 250 metres, 1000 metres, Relay race 4 x 110 yards and 4 x 220 yards and 120 yards, Racewalking 1000 metres, high jump, long jump, discus throw, shot put and javelin. The tournament also held exhibition events in cycling (two-thirds of a mile bicycle sprint), netball, and gymnastics.

The multi-sport event was held at "Stamford Bridge" in Fulham in southwest London. The games attended an audience of 25,000 spectators.

Results 
Almost all medals went to athletes from France and the United Kingdom.

During the games 7 world records  were set: Mary Lines in hurdling 120 yd and running 250 m, Edith Trickey in running 1000 m, Albertine Regel in walking 1000 m, Elise van Truyen in high jump, Violett Morris in discus and Louise Groslimond in javelin. Poorly performed measuring however led to that only 2 records, Trickey in running 1000 metres and Regel in walking 1000 metres, later were ratified.

Results in each event:

 Each athlete in the shot put and javelin throw events threw using their right hand, then their left. Their final mark was the total of the best mark with their right-handed throw and the best mark with their left-handed throw.

Legacy 
The tournament was a huge promotion for women's sports, a follow-up was held in 1925 ("Daily Mirror Trophy") also at Stamford Bridge. In 1926 the second regular Women's World Games were held at Gothenburg.

References

External links 
 Film 1924 Women's Olympiad, Topical Budget (YouTube)
 Film 1924 Women's Olympiad (British Film Institute)

Multi-sport events in the United Kingdom
International sports competitions hosted by the United Kingdom
International athletics competitions hosted by the United Kingdom
International sports competitions in London
Women's Olympiad
Women's Olympiad
Women's Olympiad
Women's Olympiad
Olympiad
History of sport in the United Kingdom
Women's Olympiad
Women's Olympiad
Women's World Games